Paul Cowan may refer to:
 Paul Cowan (journalist), Scottish-Canadian journalist and writer
 Paul Cowan (filmmaker), Canadian filmmaker
 Paul Cowan (writer), American journalist and writer